DWSS stands for Defense Weather Satellite System. It may also refer to:
 DWSS-AM, an AM radio station broadcasting in Metro Manila
 DWSS-FM, an FM radio station broadcasting in Naga, Camarines Sur